Elections to Bolton Metropolitan Borough Council were held on 4 May 2000. One third of the council was up for election and the Labour Party kept overall control of the council.

20 seats were contested in the election, with 9 being won by the Labour Party, 7 by the Conservatives and 4 by the Liberal Democrats

After the election, the composition of the council was:
Labour 34
Conservative 15
Liberal Democrat 11

Result

Council Composition
Prior to the election the composition of the council was:

After the election the composition of the council was:

LD – Liberal Democrats

Ward results

Astley Bridge ward

Blackrod ward

Bradshaw ward

Breightmet ward

Bromley Cross ward

Burnden ward

Central ward

Daubhill ward

Deane-cum-Heaton ward

Derby ward

Farnworth ward

Halliwell ward

Harper Green ward

Horwich ward

Hulton Park ward

Kearsley ward

Little Lever ward

Smithills ward

Tonge ward

Westhoughton ward

Sources

Notes

References
 

2000
2000 English local elections
2000s in Greater Manchester